Richard Grosvenor, 1st Earl Grosvenor (18 June 1731 – 5 August 1802), known as Sir Richard Grosvenor, 7th Baronet between 1755 and 1761 and as the Lord Grosvenor between 1761 and 1784, was a British peer, racehorse owner and art collector. He was created Baron Grosvenor in 1761 and in 1784 became both Viscount Belgrave and Earl Grosvenor.

Early life
Richard Grosvenor was born at Eaton Hall, Cheshire, the elder son of Sir Robert Grosvenor, 6th Baronet and Jane Warre. He was educated at Oriel College, Oxford, graduating MA in 1751 and DCL in 1754.

Political life
He became Member of Parliament for Chester in 1754 and continued to represent the city until 1761, when he became Baron Grosvenor and was elevated to the House of Lords. He was mayor of Chester in 1759 and in 1769 he paid for the building of the Eastgate in the city. Grosvenor extended his estate by the purchase of the village of Belgrave, and the manor of Eccleston in 1769. He succeeded as 7th baronet on the death of his father in 1755.

Initially, Grosvenor was, like his father, a Tory, but later he came to support the ideas of William Pitt the Elder. In 1758 he declared himself in favour of the Pitt–Newcastle ministry and following this he was created Baron Grosvenor in 1761. However, when the Tory Earl of Bute became Prime Minister the following year, Grosvenor changed his allegiance. Then, when Pitt was returned to power in the Chatham Ministry of 1766–1768, Grosvenor returned to support him.  During the 1770s he supported Lord North during the American War of Independence. He voted against Fox's India Bill in 1783 and was rewarded by William Pitt the Younger with title of Earl Grosvenor the following year.

Personal interests
Otherwise, Grosvenor was interested in the acquisition of art and in horse racing with Potoooooooo. He was also the principal patron of the satirist and journalist William Gifford. For his art collection he acquired works from Italy, and also bought paintings from Benjamin West (including his painting of The Death of General Wolfe), Thomas Gainsborough, Richard Wilson and George Stubbs. In 1788 a collection of literary pieces composed at Eaton was published as The Eaton Chronicle, or The Salt-Box. Grosvenor was appointed as a Fellow of the Royal Society in 1777. To breed his race horses Grosvenor established studs at Wallasey and at Eaton. His horses won the Derby on three occasions and the Oaks six times. His racing silks were yellow, with a black cap.

In the 1760s, Grosvenor occupied Aubrey House, in the Campden Hill area of Holland Park. A London County Council blue plaque commemorates Grosvenor and other residents of the house.

Family
On 19 July 1764 Grosvenor married Henrietta Vernon, daughter of Henry Vernon of Hilton Park, Staffordshire; they had four sons. However, the marriage was not happy, and Henrietta had an affair with Henry, Duke of Cumberland, the younger brother of George III. The couple were discovered in flagrante delicto in 1769, which led to Grosvenor bringing an action against the Duke for "criminal conversation" (that is, adultery). He was awarded damages of £10,000, which together with costs, amounted to an award of £13,000 (£ in 2015).  But Grosvenor was also known to be guilty of adultery himself, regularly seeking out prostitutes around Leicester Square, so he could not sue for divorce. The couple separated and he settled an annual allowance of £1,200 (£ in 2015) on his estranged wife, who entered the demi-monde and was a leading member of The New Female Coterie.

Death
Grosvenor died at Earls Court in 1802 and was buried in the family vault at St Mary's Church, Eccleston.  His assets amounted to "under £70,000" (£ in 2015), but his debts were "over £100,000" (£ in 2015). In 1799 he (or his immediate family benefit trust) was estimated the wealthiest small family unit in Britain by a margin of 49%, owning £6.25M. He was succeeded at Eaton Hall by his eldest son Robert.

References

1731 births
1802 deaths
People from Cheshire
British racehorse owners and breeders
Richard Grosvenor, 1st Earl Grosvenor
Owners of Epsom Derby winners
Grosvenor, Richard, 7th Baronet
Grosvenor, Richard, 7th Baronet
Fellows of the Royal Society
Earls Grosvenor
Peers of Great Britain created by George III